The West Indian cricket team toured the United Arab Emirates from September to November 2016 to play three Twenty20 International (T20Is), three One Day Internationals (ODIs) and three Test matches against Pakistan. The West Indies Cricket Board (WICB) agreed in principle for one of the Test matches to be played as a day/night match.

Originally, the schedule was going to be two Tests, five ODIs and two T20Is. In May 2016, the Pakistan Cricket Board (PCB) began looking at the possibility for the series to be held in Sri Lanka. However, the idea was dismissed as it would be monsoon season in Sri Lanka. The fixtures, including the day/night Test at the Dubai International Cricket Stadium, Dubai, were confirmed by the PCB in August 2016.

The first Test in Dubai was Pakistan's 400th Test match and the second day/night Test. Prior to the start of the day/night Test, both captains voiced their support for the format. Pakistan's captain Misbah-ul-Haq said "At the moment, it looks like (the future) keeping in mind the interest of the audience, who want to watch Test cricket". The West Indies captain Jason Holder said that he liked the concept and that "we have to give a chance to something new". However, at the start of the first day of the Test, only 68 fans were inside the stadium, with the figure growing to approximately 600 by close of play. Pakistan's coach Mickey Arthur said after the conclusion of the day/night Test that "there's some work to do with the pink ball. I don't think it's up to the standard required yet and I think that's the only thing holding day/night cricket back".

Pakistan won both the ODI and T20I series 3–0. The Test series was also won by Pakistan, by the margin of 2–1. The West Indies won the final Test match of the series, which was their first Test win with Jason Holder as captain. After the victory, Holder said "we showed character and fight. Credit must go to Kraigg Brathwaite. He played an outstanding innings in the first innings and took responsibility of the chase in the second innings".

Squads

Andre Russell was ruled out of the West Indies T20I squad after withdrawing due to a personal matter. He was replaced by Kesrick Williams. Younis Khan was added to Pakistan's Test squad for the 2nd Test after missing the 1st Test due to dengue fever.

Tour matches

T20: Emirates Cricket Board XI vs West Indies

Two-day: Emirates Cricket Board XI vs West Indies

First-class: Pakistan Cricket Board Patron's XI vs West Indies

T20I series

1st T20I

2nd T20I

3rd T20I

ODI series

1st ODI

2nd ODI

3rd ODI

Test series

1st Test

2nd Test

3rd Test

References

External links
 Series home at ESPN Cricinfo

2016 in West Indian cricket
2016 in Pakistani cricket
International cricket competitions in 2016–17
West Indian cricket tours of Pakistan
West Indies 2016